Fay Tincher (April 17, 1884 – October 11, 1983) was an American comic actress in motion pictures of the silent film era.

Early years
Tincher was born in Topeka, Kansas, and was the daughter of George Tincher and Elizabeth Tincher. She had three sisters, Mary, Ruth, and Julia. Her father was mayor of Topeka and the state printer. As a child, she studied dance, elocution, and music. When she was a teenager, she attended a dramatic school in Chicago and performed in light opera there.

Early career
Although Tincher planned to perform in dramas, she ended up in comedy and later went into vaudeville, performing in Europe as well as in the United States.

Tincher began her career on stage. In 1908 she was touring in California with The Merry Go Round Company. In August of that year she may have married fellow actor, Ned Buckley, on a dare. He was a Yale graduate and a resident of Bridgeport, Connecticut. She visited her lawyer at the New York Life Insurance Building at 112-114 Broadway (Manhattan). She asked him to obtain a divorce if he learned that she was truly wed.

While performing on the Keith-Albee-Orpheum vaudeville circuit, Tincher was approached by a man who commented about her resemblance to actress Mabel Normand. She did not know Normand because she had never seen a movie in 1913. The agent gave her his card and said he wanted director D.W. Griffith to see her. The following day she came calling at Biograph Studios. In her first role Griffith cast her in the role of a vamp. Within three weeks she began to play comedy, at first slapstick, and later comedy drama.

Films

Tincher's film debut came in 1914. She played in Bill Manages A Fighter (1914), one of a series of Bill comedy shorts. It was made by the Komic Pictures Company of Los Angeles, California. The performers worked out of the Reliance Studios. Directed by Edward Dillon, former ex-lightweight fighter Hobo Dougherty was among the featured actors. In one scene Tincher encourages Dougherty to get knocked out on film. However she has trouble convincing the fight veteran that he is not really in a pugilistic contest.

By the end of 1915 Tincher worked for the Fine Arts Film Company. Aside from comic roles, she often depicted working class types such as a laundry girl in Laundry Liz (1916). Dillon directed and Anita Loos was the scenarist. The short movie was released by the Keystone Film Company. In Skirts (1916) Tincher plays an artist's model who becomes a victim of drugs. This was a new type of role for her. Tully Marshall plays the artist.

Griffith staged a presentation of comic bull fights, massive floats, theatrical comedy, and drama, in July 1915. The production was
called the Pageant of the Photoplay. Audiences were able to view directors carrying megaphones, the process of film development, and movies being put together in make-up rooms. Tincher played a dramatic part in a comedy on the final day of the event. A stage was assembled and four scenes were acted out.

In 1918 Tincher became head of her own company, Fay Tincher Productions. Her movies were released by the World Film Company.

In the Andy Gump comedy series (1923–1928) Tincher played Min, who wears her hair bobbed, alongside Joe Murphy as her husband, Andy Gump. The series numbered around forty-five films and was produced by Universal Pictures and Samuel Von Honkel.
American cartoonist Sidney Smith created the film characters.

Tincher's final motion picture was All Wet (1930). This is a two reel comedy short directed by Sam Newfield.

Inheritance

Tincher inherited $25,000 from the bequest of the will of Mrs. Julian Dick, who died from inhaling illuminating gas on December 22, 1930. Dick's residence was at 116 East 36th Street in New York City. Her husband, Captain Dick, was a member of the New York Cotton Exchange. He had been accidentally shot to death by a friend in 1922.

Personal life and death

In May 1915 Tincher won a bathing suit contest at Venice Beach, California, winning a first prize of $50. She wore a costume that was resembled her famous typewriter dress, which she wore in movies. A crowd of approximately 75,000 attended the procession.

In 1918, she roomed with scenario writer, Maie B. Havey, in a small bungalow. Tincher liked working in the fine art of vitreous enamel.

Fay Tincher, at age 99, died of a heart attack in Brooklyn, New York, in 1983.

Partial filmography
The Battle of the Sexes (1914)
The Quicksands (1914)
Home, Sweet Home (1914)
Nell's Eugenic Wedding (1914)
The Escape (1914)
Sunshine Dad (1916)
Excitement (1924)
The Reckless Age (1924)

References
 

Janesville Daily Gazette, "Fay Tincher To Star", August 8, 1916, Page 6.
Janesville Daily Gazette, "News Notes From Movieland", Friday, July 26, 1918, Page 6.
Los Angeles Times, "Fay Tincher Proud Winner", May 10, 1915, Page III1.
Los Angeles Times, "Bullfighters Are Off Form", July 12, 1915, Page III1.
Los Angeles Times, "Busy Fay", August 2, 1915, Page III4.
Los Angeles Times, "Joins The Workers", June 25, 1916, Page III18.
The New York Times, "Notes Written On The Screen", September 27, 1914, Page X8.
The New York Times, "Mrs. Dick Left $50,000", January 13, 1931, Page 20.
Oakland Tribune, "Am I Mrs. Or Miss? Is This Lady's Query", August 13, 1908, Page 1.
Oakland Tribune, "Facts For Fans", August 17, 1924, Page 38.

External links

Fay Tincher  at Women Film Pioneers Project

Actresses from Kansas
American film actresses
American silent film actresses
American stage actresses
Tincher family
Vaudeville performers
Actors from Topeka, Kansas
1884 births
1983 deaths
20th-century American actresses
Women film pioneers